Pimelea angustifolia, commonly known as narrow-leaved pimelea, is a small upright, slender or open shrub with whitish, cream, yellow or pink flowers. It is endemic to Western Australia.

Description

Taxonomy and naming
Pimelea angustifolia was first formally described in 1810 by Robert  Brown in his book Prodromus Florae Novae Hollandiae et Insulae Van Diemen. The specific epithet (angustifolia) is from the Latin angustus meaning "narrow" and -folius meaning "-leaved".

Distribution and habitat
Narrow-leaved pimelea is a widespread species, it grows from Kalbarri, in coastal areas to the South Australian border and inland north of Kalgoorlie mostly on sand, sandy clay, lateritic  rock locations in sand dunes, plains, ridges and occasionally in wetter sites.

Conservation status
It is not considered to be threatened at this time.

References

angustifolia
Malvales of Australia
Flora of Western Australia
Plants described in 1810
Taxa named by Robert Brown (botanist, born 1773)